The 1977 Amco Cup was the 4th edition of the NSWRFL Midweek Cup, a NSWRFL-organised national club Rugby League tournament between the leading clubs and representative teams from the NSWRFL, the BRL, the CRL, the QRL, the NZRL, Western Australia and the Northern Territory.

A total of 37 teams from across Australia and New Zealand played 36 matches in a straight knock-out format, with the matches being held midweek during the premiership season.

Qualified teams

Venues

Round 1

Round 2

Round 3

Quarter finals

Semi finals

Final

 *- Advanced on penalty count-back

Awards

Player of the Series
 Graeme O'Grady (Western Suburbs)

Golden Try
 Steve Rogers (Cronulla-Sutherland)

References

1977
1977 in Australian rugby league
1977 in New Zealand rugby league